Guldy (Kaitag and Dargwa: Гъулди) is a rural locality (a selo) in Dzhirabachinsky Selsoviet, Kaytagsky District, Republic of Dagestan, Russia. The population was 145 as of 2010.

Geography 
Guldy is located 23 km southwest of Madzhalis (the district's administrative centre) by road. Surgiya and Dzurmachi are the nearest rural localities.

Nationalities 
Dargins live there.

References 

Rural localities in Kaytagsky District